Louise de Bossigny, comtesse d'Auneuil, (? – 10 January 1700) was a French salonnière and author of fairy tales.

Life 

She married the Comte d'Auneuil and established her standing in Paris and at court with a salon that was "open to all the beaux esprits and to all the women who wrote." Her fairy tale collection, La Tiranie des fées détruite (The Tyranny of the Fairies Destroyed), playfully alludes to the pre-existing genre of fairy tales popular in her time. Her final work, Les Chevaliers errans et le genie familier (The Knights Errant and the Familiar Genie), is divided into two sections, the first evoking chivalric romances and the second presenting a brief sequence of tales purportedly translated from Arabic.

Works 

 La Tiranie des fées détruite (1702)
 L'Origine des cornes, ou l'Inconstance punie (1702)
 La Princesse des Pretintailles (1702)
 L'Origine du lansquenet (1703)
 Les Chevaliers errans et le genie familier (1709)

References

External links 
 Works by Louise de Bossigny Auneuil at the Bibliothèque nationale de France
 La Tyrannie des fées détruite in Le Cabinet des fées at Internet Archive
 Les Chevaliers errans et le genie familier at Internet Archive
 Partial translations of The Knights Errant and The Tyranny of the Fairies Destroyed in a volume of work conflated with Madame d'Aulnoy's at HathiTrust

Collectors of fairy tales
French countesses
French nobility
French women writers
French salon-holders
17th-century French writers
17th-century French women writers
18th-century French writers
18th-century French women writers
1700 deaths